Chinese racism may refer to:

 Racism in China or Ethnic issues in China, including
 anti-Japanese sentiment in China
 Racism by the Han Chinese people, including
 Han chauvinism, the belief in the superiority of the Han Chinese people and culture to others within the Republic and People's Republic of China
 Sinocentrism, the belief in the superiority of Han Chinese people and culture to others throughout the world
 Anti-Manchuism, the historical animus against the race of the ruling class of the Qing Dynasty
 the Hua–Yi distinction, the historical establishment of a Chinese Huaxia people by othering those surrounding them (many of these now considered members of the Han people)
 Sinophobia, racism against the Chinese, including
 Anti-Chinese sentiment in the United States and Japan
 the Yellow Peril, the late-19th and early-20th century fear of a modernizing China

See also
 Racism in Asia
 laowai
 Anti-Chinese legislation in the United States
 The Canadian Chinese Exclusion Act